Braly may refer to:

People with the surname
Angela Braly, CEO of WellPoint
Malcolm Braly (1925–1980), American author
Terrell Braly (born 1953), founder of Quizno's
W. C. Braly (1841–1920), American politician

Places
Braly, California, former name of Brawley, California
Braly Municipal Stadium, in Florence, Alabama